Frank Weston Benson made portraits, landscapes, seascapes, murals, and paintings of interiors and still life. He also made other works of art including etchings.

While Benson studied at the Académie Julian in Paris, he made the small Impressionistic oil painting, Paris Parade. Benson stayed the summer at the Grand Hotel in Concarneau, France where he became engaged to the daughter of friends from Salem, Massachusetts, Ellen Perry Peirson. They married three years later, after Benson had an opportunity to establish himself in his career.

Works

Notes

References

Bibliography

External links

Frank Weston Benson